Fred Duprez (September 6, 1884 – October 27, 1938) was an American actor, comedian and singer who performed in vaudeville, phonograph record and film.  He made phonograph recordings in the US and the UK in the 1900s, 1910s, and 1920s. Most of the films he appeared in were British. He was also a writer, and wrote the popular stage farce My Wife's Family, filmed three times in Britain, firstly in 1931;  once in Sweden in 1932; and once in Finland, in 1933.

Fred Duprez was born in Detroit, Michigan. He died from a heart attack on board a ship en route to England. He was the father of the actress, June Duprez.

Partial filmography

 Heads We Go (1933) - George Anderson
 Meet My Sister (1933) - Hiram Sowerby
 My Old Duchess (1934) - Jesse Martin
 Without You (1934) - Baron Gustav von Steinmeyer
 Love, Life and Laughter (1934) - Sam Greenbaum
 Danny Boy (1934) - Leo Newman
 Dance Band (1935) - Lewes
 No Monkey Business (1935) - Theater Manager
 Dark World (1935) - Schwartz
 Ball at Savoy (1936) - Not Herbert
 A Wife or Two (1936) - Sam Hickleberry
 Queen of Hearts (1936) - Zulenberg
 Gypsy Melody (1936) - Herbert P. Melon
 Hearts of Humanity (1936) - Manager
 You Must Get Married (1936) - Cyrus P. Hankin
 The Big Noise (1936) - Henry Hadley
 Reasonable Doubt (1936)
 Head over Heels (1937) - Norma's Manager
 Cafe Colette (1937) - Burnes
 Knights for a Day (1937) - Custer
 O-Kay for Sound (1937) - Hyman Goldberger
 The Pearls of the Crown (1937) - American (uncredited)
 All That Glitters (1937) - Mortimer
 Kathleen Mavourneen (1938) - Walter Bryant
 Hey! Hey! USA (1938) - Cyrus Schultz
 Take Off That Hat (1938) - Burroughs
 The Mysterious Mr. Davis (1939) - Wilcox (final film role)

References

External links

1884 births
1938 deaths
American male film actors
Male actors from Detroit
20th-century American male actors
American emigrants to the United Kingdom